Gabriel Maximiliano Graciani (born 28 November 1993) is an Argentine professional footballer who plays as a right midfielder for Instituto.

Career
Graciani's first club were Colón, with whom he made ninety-seven appearances for and scored eight goals in the Argentine Primera División; the first of which came during his third career appearance in a home loss to Gimnasia y Esgrima on 25 February 2011. Graciani also scored goals on his domestic cup and continental cup debuts, netting in a win over Talleres in the Copa Argentina in November 2011 and against Racing Club in the Copa Sudamericana in August 2012. On 13 July 2014, Graciani joined fellow Primera División team Estudiantes. He made his Estudiantes debut on 11 August versus Arsenal de Sarandí.

2015 saw Graciani leave Estudiantes on loan twice. Firstly, on 8 February, to Independiente where he featured six times before returning. Secondly, on 30 June, to Atlético de Rafaela where he remained until 2016 after four goals in twenty-five appearances. He returned to Estudiantes for the 2016–17 campaign and featured seven times, but was loaned out for a third time midway through the season to Patronato. He scored on his Patronato debut against Arsenal de Sarandí on 10 March 2017. In September 2017, Graciani left Estudiantes permanently to play for San Martín of Primera B Nacional.

San Martín won promotion in 2017–18, though Graciani subsequently departed to join Olimpo; a recently-relegated Primera B Nacional team.

Personal life
Graciani is the nephew and namesake of former footballer Gabriel Graciani.

Career statistics
.

References

External links

1993 births
Living people
Sportspeople from Entre Ríos Province
Argentine sportspeople of Italian descent
Argentine footballers
Association football wingers
Association football midfielders
Argentine Primera División players
Primera Nacional players
Club Atlético Colón footballers
Estudiantes de La Plata footballers
Club Atlético Independiente footballers
Atlético de Rafaela footballers
Club Atlético Patronato footballers
San Martín de Tucumán footballers
Olimpo footballers
Club Atlético Sarmiento footballers
Instituto footballers